USS Clark has been the name of more than one United States Navy ship, and may refer to:
 , a destroyer in commission from 1936 to 1945
 , a frigate in commission from 1980 to 2000

See also
 , a tug in commission from 1917 to 1920

United States Navy ship names